Sergei Vasilyevich Kurdyukov (born 3 September 1982) is a former Russian professional football player.

Club career
He made his Russian Football National League debut for FC Terek Grozny on 26 March 2006 in a game against FC Angusht Nazran.

External links
 

1982 births
Footballers from Tambov
Living people
Russian footballers
FC Spartak Tambov players
FC Akhmat Grozny players
FC Metallurg Lipetsk players
FC Dynamo Stavropol players
Association football defenders
FC Tambov players